Blenniella gibbifrons, also known as the hump-headed blenny, bullethead rockskipper or picture rockskipper, is a species of combtooth blenny found in coral reefs in the Pacific and Indian Oceans from East Africa in the west to the Hawaiian, Line and Ducie Islands, in the east and north to Marcus Island.

It was first recorded by French biologists Quoy and Gaimard in 1824.

Biology 
Blenniella gibbifrons inhabit the shallow water near the shore of intertidal reef flats. They prefer water from 0.5 to 1.5 m deep where the substrate consists of a thin carpet of algal turf and sand.  They inhabit the water layer immediately above the bottom (benthic)  . They are Oviparous  with the eggs and young left to fend for themselves. Eggs are adhesive and are attached to the bottom by a threadlike, adhesive pad or pedestal . Larvae are planktonic  and often found swimming in shallow, coastal waters.

References

gibbifrons
Fish of Oceania
Fish of the Indian Ocean
Fish of the Pacific Ocean
Fish of Asia
Fish of Africa
Fish of Hawaii
Articles containing video clips
Fish described in 1824